Derek Barrett (born 4 February 1977) is an Irish hurling coach and former player. He is the coach of Cork Senior Championship division Imokilly. Barrett had a lengthy career with East Cork club Cobh while he also played for the Cork senior hurling team for eight years, during which time he usually lined out as a right wing-back.

Barrett began his hurling and Gaelic football career at club level with Cobh. He enjoyed his greatest success in 1994 when he was part of the Cork Minor Football Championship-winning team. Barrett's prowess also saw him selected for the Imokilly divisional hurling team with whom he won back-to-back Cork Hurling Championship medals in 1997 and 1998.

At inter-county level, Barrett was part of the successful Cork minor team that won the All-Ireland Championship in 1995 before later winning back-to-back All-Ireland Championships with the under-21 team in 1997 and 1998. After one season with the Cork junior team he won an All-Ireland Championship with the intermediate team in 1997. Barrett joined the Cork senior team in 1996. From his debut, he usually lined out in the half-back line and made 10 Championship appearances in a career that ended with his last game in 2003. During that time Barrett was part of Cork's All-Ireland Championship-winning team in 1999. He also secured three Munster Championship medals and a National Hurling League medal.

Barrett is one of only a handful of players to have won the complete set of Munster Championship medals - minor, under-21, junior, intermediate and senior. At inter-provincial level, he was selected to play in two championship campaigns with Munster, with Railway Cup medals being won on both occasion in 2000 and 2001.

Career statistics

Honours

As a player

Cobh
Cork Minor A Football Championship (1): 1994

Imokilly
Cork Senior Hurling Championship (1): 1997, 1998

Cork
All-Ireland Senior Hurling Championship (1): 1999
Munster Senior Hurling Championship (3): 1999, 2000, 2003
National Hurling League (1): 1998
All-Ireland Intermediate Hurling Championship (1): 1997
Munster Intermediate Hurling Championship (1): 1997
Munster Junior Hurling Championship (1): 1996
All-Ireland Under-21 Hurling Championship (2): 1997, 1998
Munster Under-21 Hurling Championship (3): 1996, 1997, 1998
All-Ireland Minor Hurling Championship (1): 1995
Munster Minor Hurling Championship (2): 1994, 1995

As a coach

Imokilly
Cork Senior Hurling Championship (1): 2017, 2018

References

External links
 Derek Barrett profile at the Hogan Stand website

1977 births
Living people
Cobh hurlers
Cobh Gaelic footballers
Cork inter-county hurlers
Cork inter-county Gaelic footballers
Munster inter-provincial hurlers
Hurling selectors